Kenga is a Bongo–Bagirmi language of Chad. Speakers make up the majority of the population in Kenga canton in Bitkine sub-prefecture.

References

Languages of Chad
Bongo–Bagirmi languages